Kissing Rain is a 1996 English language album by Canadian singer Roch Voisine. It includes the title track, which was a big hit for Roch Voisine.

Track listing

External links
Roch Voisine Official site album page

1996 albums
Roch Voisine albums
Ariola Records albums
Albums produced by Guy Roche
Albums produced by Richard Marx
Albums produced by Richie Zito